Edward C. Akin (July 19, 1852 – June 21, 1936) was an American lawyer and politician.

Born in Will County, Illinois, Akin attended the Joliet, Illinois public school system and went to college at the University of Michigan. He worked as a teller at the First National Bank of Joliet. In 1878, Akin was admitted to the Illinois bar. He served as Joliet City Attorney in 1887 and as State's Attorney of Will County in 1888. In 1895, Akin was elected Mayor of Joliet and was a Republican. 

From 1897 to 1901, Akin served as Illinois Attorney General. Akin died at his house in Joliet, Illinois.

Notes

1852 births
1936 deaths
Mayors of Joliet, Illinois
University of Michigan alumni
Illinois Republicans
Illinois Attorneys General